Kandeh Qulan may refer to:
 Kandeh Qulan-e Sofla